Clydesdale RFC was a nineteenth-century and early twentieth-century Glasgow-based rugby union club, who were attached to Clydesdale Cricket Club during the 1880s.

Formation

The rugby club was formed in 1889. For a short period before the First World War it was one of Scotland's most successful teams. By 1906 it could run 4 teams.

Honours

 Scottish Unofficial Championship
 Champions (1) : 1896 (shared with Jed-Forest and Watsonians)
 Hawick Sevens
 Champions (1): 1908
 Melrose Sevens
 Runners-Up (1): 1907

Notable former players

Scotland internationalists

The following former Clydesdale players have represented Scotland at full international level.

Glasgow District players

The following former Clydesdale players have represented Glasgow District at provincial level.

References

1889 establishments in Scotland
Rugby clubs established in 1889
Scottish rugby union teams
Sports teams in Glasgow
Defunct Scottish rugby union clubs
Pollokshields
Rugby union in Glasgow